An annular solar eclipse occurred on March 7, 1932. A solar eclipse occurs when the Moon passes between Earth and the Sun, thereby totally or partly obscuring the image of the Sun for a viewer on Earth. An annular solar eclipse occurs when the Moon's apparent diameter is smaller than the Sun's, blocking most of the Sun's light and causing the Sun to look like an annulus (ring). An annular eclipse appears as a partial eclipse over a region of the Earth thousands of kilometres wide.

Related eclipses

Solar eclipses 1931–1935

Saros 119 
It is a part of Saros cycle 119, repeating every 18 years, 11 days, containing 71 events. The series started with partial solar eclipse on May 15, 850 AD. It contains total eclipses on August 9, 994 AD and August 20, 1012 with a hybrid eclipse on August 31, 1030. It has annular eclipses from September 10, 1048 through March 18, 1950. The series ends at member 71 as a partial eclipse on June 24, 2112. The longest duration of totality was only 32 seconds on August 20, 1012. The longest duration of annularity was 7 minutes, 37 seconds on September 1, 1625. The longest duration of hybridity was only 18 seconds on August 31, 1030.

Metonic series

Notes

References

1932 3 7
1932 3 7
1932 in science
March 1932 events